Life Is Life (tr. Haïm Ze Haïm) is a 2003 Israeli independent underground dramatic art film directed by Michal Bat-Adam.

Synopsis
Macky (Moshe Ivgy), a 50-year-old novelist and university lecturer, is having an affair with Ayala (Yael Abecassis), his 32-year-old former student who is currently a literature teacher. Ayala's husband leaves home and she, offended, collapses. Despite her love for Macky, she refuses to meet him. Macky, heartbroken due to Ayala's lack of presence in his life, feels as if his ability to write has disappeared because of this fact. Surprisingly, he finds his way back to his own wife, Miriam (Hanny Nahmias), despite the fact that he has long ago ceased to be interested in her.

Reception
Abroad, Variety critic Joe Leydon called the film a "melancholy dramedy about missed connections and libidinal vicissitudes" that "likely will satisfy discerning auds during its global fest tour."

References

External links

2003 drama films
2003 independent films
2003 films
Adultery in films
Films about educators
Films about families
Films about writers
Films directed by Michal Bat-Adam
Films set in Israel
Films shot in Israel
2000s Hebrew-language films
Israeli drama films
Israeli independent films